Graham Harvey (born 11 February 1984) is an English football manager and former player who is the technical director of Australian club Redlands United.

Club career
After being released by Stevenage Borough as a youth player, Harvey played semi-professional football for Eastleigh, as well as Whitsunday Miners in Australia.

Managerial career
After graduating with a Masters in Sports Coaching from Loughborough University, Harvey worked at a number of English clubs as a youth coach. His first foray into management came in Australia, where he managed Brisbane Strikers, Whitsunday Miners and most notably Western Pride.

Following his managerial stints in Australia, Harvey was appointed assistant manager at Hong Kong club Eastern. He left this role in 2019 and returned to Australia joining Redlands United as their technical director. He also went on to work as assistant for the China women's under-16 football team, as well as the Guam national football team.

In June 2021, he was appointed manager of Filipino side Kaya–Iloilo under a short-term contract to lead the club's debut campaign in the AFC Champions League. His first game in charge was the play-off round, where they defeated Shanghai Port 1–0 to qualify for the competition proper. However, Kaya lost all their matches in Group F, which contained defending champions Ulsan Hyundai, Thai League 1 champions BG Pathum United, and V.League 1 champions Viettel FC. At the end of his contract, Harvey returned to Redlands United.

Career statistics

Managerial

References

1984 births
Living people
English footballers
Association football defenders
Stevenage F.C. players
Eastleigh F.C. players
Whitsunday Miners FC players
English football managers
English expatriate football managers
English expatriate sportspeople in Australia
Expatriate soccer players in Australia
Expatriate soccer managers in Australia
English expatriate sportspeople in Hong Kong
Expatriate football managers in Hong Kong
English expatriate sportspeople in China
Expatriate football managers in China
English expatriate sportspeople in Guam
Expatriate football managers in Guam
English expatriate sportspeople in the Philippines
Expatriate football managers in the Philippines